Bristol Handball Club is an English Handball club based in Bristol, England and founded in 2006 and playing in EHA's League and Cup competitions. Although the teams train in Bristol at City Academy, they regularly play their "home" games at Wellington's Princess Royal Sports Complex due to a lack of facilities in Bristol.

Recent history
Despite Bristol Handball not being in the top tier of English Handball the club upset Liverpool Handball Club in the 2009/10 EHA Cup in a low scoring 16–13 win against the top-tier side. Bristol Handball faced Manchester (one of the top three ranked teams in the country) in their Quarter Final tie and lost narrowly 30–25.

Bristol Handball Club lost out on promotion to England's top level in 2011/2012 at the final hurdle, losing out in the play-offs. This being their most successful season to-date.

2015/16 
In 2015/16 Bristol Handball Club and local rivals Bath University thought closely for the league, however it was down to games between the two clubs that ended with Bath winning and Bristol finishing second in the SW Development League.

2016/17 
A mixed season for the players of both men's and ladies teams in 2016/17, with the men finishing fourth in the South West Regional Development League and the ladies finishing fifth.

2017/18 
The start of 2017/18 season saw a lot of player changes, with new players coming in and a number of the international students heading home.  The league itself was also rebranded as the Regional League South West.

The men's team had an excellent year, registering their first victory over Bath University for a number of years and ending up as Champions with 5 more points than runners up and last year's champions South Wales.  At the end of the season, Bristol played Chelsea at the Derby Arena for a place in the National League South and in a hard-fought and exciting game, Bristol were victorious winning 36–32 to secure promotion.

The ladies team also had a strong season with a number of excellent victories through the season, beating all teams in the league at least once, apart from champions Reading, who were promoted to the Premier Handball League.  In the National Cup, Bristol had an exciting run and made it through to the last 8, eventually losing to a very strong London GD side at the Copper Box in London.

2018/19 
Following promotion for the men's team in 2017/18, a second men's team was formed for the 2018/19 season. The team was named Bristol Spartans to highlight the link between Bristol Handball Club and Somerset Spartans whose youth teams feed into BHC's senior teams.  The men's first team play in the EHA National League South, whereas Bristol Spartans continue BHC's representation in the EHA Regional League South West.  The women's team continue to compete in the EHA Regional League South West.

During October 2018, Bristol were proud to support 17 year old BHC and Somerset Spartan player George Sawyer who represented Great Britain in Kosovo in the IHF Trophy where GB finished with the silver medal.

Current men's squad 2022/2023

Current ladies squad 2022/2023

Achievements
EHA Men's Regional South West League
Winners: (1): 2017-18 Men's 1st Team
EHA National League South Play Off
Winners: (1): 2017-18 Men's 1st Team

References

External links
Official website
Official Facebook
 Follow Them On Twitter
 Follow Them On Instagram

English handball clubs
Sport in Bristol